The following lists events that happened during 1993 in Burundi.

Incumbents
President:
until July 10: Pierre Buyoya
July 10-October 21: Melchior Ndadaye
October 21-October 27: François Ngeze
starting October 27: Sylvie Kinigi
Prime Minister: Adrien Sibomana (until July 10), Sylvie Kinigi (starting July 10)

Events

October
 October 21 - President Ndadaye was assassinated by Tutsi extremists, starting another genocide against Tutsis and a civil war.

References

 
1990s in Burundi
Years of the 20th century in Burundi
Burundi
Burundi